Jean-Baptiste Delille (24 December 1912 – 6 July 1993) was a French racing cyclist. He rode in the 1947 Tour de France.

References

External links
 

1912 births
1993 deaths
French male cyclists
Sportspeople from Nord (French department)
Cyclists from Hauts-de-France